The Czechoslovakia men's national under-20 basketball team was a national basketball team of Czechoslovakia. It represented the country in men's international under-20 basketball competitions. The team finished in 5th place at the 1992 FIBA Europe Under-20 Championship.

Team results

See also
Czechoslovakia men's national basketball team
Czechoslovakia men's national under-18 basketball team

References

Czechoslovakia national basketball team
Men's national under-20 basketball teams